Wilkowski or Wolkowski is a Polish surname. Notable people with the surname include:

Arthur Wilkowski (1928–1999), American politician
Bogdan Wołkowski (born 1957), Polish billiards player

See also
Witkowski

Polish-language surnames